Redcliff is a town situated in the Midlands Province of Zimbabwe, with a population of  41,526 (as of 2022).

The town sits in an extremely iron-rich area, and has relied on steel production as a source of revenue since it was founded in the early part of the 20th century. The Zimbabwe Iron and Steel Company (ZISCO, formerly RISCO, founded in 1942), which is based in Redcliff, was the town's largest employer until it closed down in 2008.

History

Education 
The only school in Redcliff in the 1980s was Redcliff Primary School, which offered education to children aged around 5 to 13. The school had three classes per grade classified by colours: red, blue and green. Around 1987, as the population of Redcliff increased. An additional class was added in most streams. School sports played at the school included hockey, swimming, rugby, cricket, rounders, netball and soccer.

Currently, schools in the town include, Redcliff Primary School, George Hill Primary School,, Zisco High School (formerly Drake Secondary School), Batanai High School and Rutendo High School.

Sports

The town has had sport success stories in soccer, rugby, basketball and athletics, benefitting from infrastructure including Zisco Club and Torwood "Mugomba" Stadium.

From the 1970s through to the mid-1990s, Ziscosteel F.C. was one of the country's best soccer teams. It had George Chieza of the Chieza family, Ephraim Moloi-Pikanegore, Abdul Njonga and the late Dr. Muganhiri. Ephraim Moloi-Pikanegore played for the national team and went on to be named in Zimbabwe’s best XI as he was known as “a player with the Midas touch”. This because each and every club he played for won the league and other trophies/cups. He played for Zimbabwean giants Highlanders FC and Zimbabwe Saints FC before he moved to play for Ziscosteel FC. Moloi-Pikanegore then went on to coach Ziscosteel FC and under his tutelage the team produced talented players such as Issa Phiri, Santo Phiri, Herbert Chilembo, Ephraim Dzimbiri, Paul Gundani, Kennedy Nagoli, Abraham Senda, Ronny Jowa and Thamsanqa Thambo to name but a few of the players who represented the Zim national team. Another notable Football mentor from Redcliff is Benedict Moyo who coached the ladies national team and also ran a Football academy in the town. Other notable players to be produced in Redcliff include Clarkson Dzimbiri, Addluck Dzimbiri, Akim Dzimbiri, Kevin Nhodza, Nakai “Cheche” & Tryan “Ponki” Vakavisser.

Zisco Rugby club also enjoyed success in the national league. It enjoyed success from players like Chunky Lewis, Christopher Bishi, Simon Mushaninga, Charlton Sibanda and Sabelo Mangena. Later on a new generation of younger players enjoyed short lived success due to financial difficulties. This young generation of players included Arnold Mutemeri, Zivai and Tafadzwa Mukuruva, David and Amon Bishi, Takesure Masanga, Prince Humbira, Phillip Tafirenyika, Robert Silubonde and many more.

Basketball has also been a success on the domestic level. 'Iron Shooters' which was formed by Ricardo Chieza and Benjamin Karigambe, included Terence Machando, Jones Masikito, Nsoro Mzemba, Henry Kupakuwana, Tawanda Tangwanda, Tinashe Masawi and Andrew Sibili. What made it remarkable was that even though they were in their early teens, in high school education and didn't have any sponsorship, they still managed to play club 'giants' of the time like the Thornhill Air Force team etc. The team later changed its name to Redcliff 'Steelers' from Ziscosteel. Steelers would get spornsorship from Afdis and were named 'Nicoli Kinicks' for two seasons. With the departure of Ricardo Chieza, Benjamin Karigambe, Terence Machando and Jones Masikito in 1997,the team remodelled and took its old name of Redcliff Steelers . They then dominated Midlands Basketball with players like Tinashe Masawi, Greaterman Mudzengi, Lazarus “KC” Kaizare and Trynos Moyo. Steelers went on to qualify for the Sprite National Basketball League in 2000 as Midlands Basketball Champions. Steelers ladies were also formed and won a number of accolades with ladies Mavis Saladi, Tafadzwa Makunike and Linda Mzemba representing the Midlands Province. 
 
Zisco Athletics teams produced many talented athletes, Christopher Madzokere, Stanley Mandebele, Melusi Ndlela, Tinos Maridza, Patson Muderedzi, Sam Madzinga and Mark Fanucci all of whom were members of Zisco's 4×100- and 4×400-metre relay team.  These five athletes represented Zisco, the Midlands province and Zimbabwe at international competitions including the 1982 Commonwealth Games in Brisbane, Australia.

The Redcliff Cricket County was then founded by Portipher Banda (Vice Captain), Osborn Nayoto (Coach), Brian Gwinji (Sponsor) and Dobson Mutemeri (Team Scorer) in the early 2000s. The club went on to produce players who represented the Midlands provincial team known as The Haggie Rhinos. These players, among others, included Portipher Banda, Sean Silubonde and Justin Lewis. Cricket also was introduced to Redcliff Primary School via an initiative by the founding members of the Redcliff Cricket County and sponsorship from the Midlands Cricket Union. Three Redcliff cricket players represented the Midlands Team Under 15 in 1992, Charles Zimbowa, Thabane Mazabane and Bond Nayoto.

Water Reticulation

Redcliff has no direct water source and is provided with water via the Kwekwe network. There have been multiple problems with payments of water bills. 
ZiscoSteel helped in the funding of Sebakwe Dam which supplies Kwekwe with water. Since the closure of ZiscoSteel, Kwekwe has switched off Redcliff numerous times.

Since the shutdown of a major firm (Ziscosteel) the standard of living of the majority became so tough, now people are relying on buying and selling, gold panning, selling scrap metal and coal.

See also
 Kwekwe 
 Redcliff constituency

References

Populated places in Midlands Province
Kwekwe District